Herbert Jackson   (25 June 1909 – 1989), known as "Jacko", was a British architect and town planner, active in Birmingham and the Black Country, England, during and after World War II. He worked in the practice of Jackson & Edmonds, and sometimes partnership with Thomas Alwyn Lloyd.

Jackson was born in 1909, the son of John Herbert Jackson. He was educated at Handsworth Grammar School and Birmingham School of Architecture. He was awarded the Saxon Snell Prize in 1931, the same year he went into private practise.

With Patrick Abercrombie, in 1948 he authored The West Midlands Plan and the North Staffordshire Plan, each commissioned by the Minister for Town and Country Planning. He was President of the Royal Birmingham Society of Artists (RBSA) from 1960–1962.

In 1955, his address was given as 25, Augustus Road, Edgbaston, Birmingham.

His portrait was sketched in 1947 by the artist Bernard Fleetwood-Walker, an earlier RBSA President, whose son, Guy, worked for Jackson & Edmonds.

Publications 

  8pp
 
  (Stourbridge; 1945), 12pp, 1s. Report accepted by Council 30 July 1945
 , prepared in 1947 for the Minister of Town & Country Planning.

References

External links 
 Fleetwood-Walker portrait

Architects from Birmingham, West Midlands
1909 births
1989 deaths
Date of death missing
20th-century English architects
Members and Associates of the Royal Birmingham Society of Artists
Fellows of the Royal Institute of British Architects